Lintas iNews (iNews Across), is an Indonesian news programme which broadcast on MNCTV, replacing Lintas from 1995 to 2017. The program broadcast for three to four hours each day through Lintas iNews Pagi (breakfast news), Lintas iNews Siang (lunchtime news), Lintas iNews (headline news), Lintas iNews Malam (late night news), and Breaking iNews (breaking news, different coverage with iNews).

See also 

 Seputar iNews
 Buletin iNews

References

Indonesian television news shows
Indonesian-language television shows
2017 Indonesian television series debuts
2010s Indonesian television series
2017 establishments in Indonesia
MNCTV original programming